A Levenspiel plot is a plot used in chemical reaction engineering to determine the required volume of a chemical reactor given experimental data on the chemical reaction taking place in it. It is named after the late chemical engineering professor Octave Levenspiel.

Derivation
For a continuous stirred-tank reactor (CSTR), the following relationship applies:

where:
 is the reactor volume
 is the molar flow rate per unit time of the entering reactant A
 is the conversion of reactant A
 is the rate of disappearance of reactant A per unit volume per unit time

For a plug flow reactor (PFR), the following relationship applies:

The volume of a PFR necessary to achieve a certain conversion at a given flow rate is equal to the area under the curve of  plotted against .

References

Chemical reaction engineering
Plots (graphics)